Loleta A. Didrickson is the former 5th Illinois Comptroller.

Career 
Didrickson was elected comptroller in 1994, succeeding Democrat Dawn Clark Netsch, who was the Democratic nominee for governor. Her Democratic opponent was State Senator Earlean Collins. Before being elected comptroller, Didrickson served for three years, under Governor Jim Edgar, as the Director of the Illinois Department of Employment Security. She had served eight years in the Illinois House of Representatives.

In 1998, Didrickson was a candidate for the United States Senate. She was strongly supported in this bid by Governor Edgar and former Republican presidential nominee Bob Dole. The latter was her national campaign chairman. In a heated primary, however, she was defeated by a more conservative candidate, State Senator Peter Fitzgerald. He went on that year to defeat incumbent Senator Carol Moseley-Braun. Didrickson was succeeded as comptroller by Democrat Dan Hynes.

References 

Comptrollers of Illinois
Republican Party members of the Illinois House of Representatives
Women state legislators in Illinois
Living people
Year of birth missing (living people)
21st-century American women